Tyler Allen Glasnow (born August 23, 1993) is an American professional baseball pitcher for the Tampa Bay Rays of Major League Baseball (MLB). He previously played in MLB for the Pittsburgh Pirates.

Early life
Glasnow was born on August 23, 1993, in Santa Clarita, California. He came from an athletic family: his father Greg swam and played water polo, his mother Donna is a retired gymnast who went on to coach for Cal State Northridge, and his older brother Ted was a decathlete for the Notre Dame Fighting Irish. Greg and Donna have also served as hardwood retailers in the Santa Clarita Valley since 1979. Glasnow attended William S. Hart High School in Santa Clarita, the alma mater of other Major League Baseball (MLB) pitchers James Shields, Trevor Bauer, and Mike Montgomery.

Career

Amateur career
Glasnow attended William S. Hart High School in Santa Clarita, California. He committed to play college baseball for the University of Portland. The Pittsburgh Pirates selected Glasnow in the fifth round of the 2011 Major League Baseball draft.

Minor Leagues
Glasnow signed with the Pirates for a $600,000 signing bonus. He made his professional debut in 2012 for the Gulf Coast Pirates of the Rookie-level Gulf Coast League in 2012 where he went 0–3 with a 2.10 ERA in 11 games (ten starts), and also started one game for the State College Spikes of the Class A-Short Season New York–Penn League. In 2013, he played for the West Virginia Power of the Class A South Atlantic League. He started 24 games and finished the season with 9–3 record, a 2.18 ERA and 164 strikeouts in 111.1 innings. His 164 strikeouts were the most in a single season in Power franchise history, surpassing Will Inman's 134 in 2006.

Glasnow played for the Bradenton Marauders of the Class A-Advanced Florida State League in 2014. In 23 starts for Bradenton, he compiled a 12–5 record and 1.74 ERA. After beginning the 2015 season with the Altoona Curve of the Class AA Eastern League, he sprained his ankle on May 6, and made his return on June 19 with the West Virginia Black Bears of the New York–Penn League. After two starts with West Virginia, Glasnow returned to Altoona. In late July, the Pirates promoted Glasnow to the Indianapolis Indians of the Class AAA International League. The Pirates considered promoting Glasnow to the major leagues in 2015, but decided against it. In 22 starts between the three clubs, Glasnow was 7–5 with a 2.39 ERA and 136 strikeouts in 109.1 innings. After the 2015 season, the Pirates added Glasnow to their 40-man roster.

Glasnow began the 2016 season with Indianapolis and had a 1.87 ERA and 133 strikeouts in  innings pitched across 20 games started.

Pittsburgh Pirates

2016-2018

The Pirates promoted Glasnow to make his major league debut on July 7. He pitched  innings in his major league debut, giving up four runs on three hits and two walks. In his second start, he left the game after three innings with a shoulder injury. He returned to the active roster on July 23 as a relief pitcher. He did not start another game until September 25. In 23.1 innings pitched for Pittsburgh, Glasnow was 0–2 with a 4.24 ERA.

Glasnow began 2017 in Pittsburgh's starting rotation. In his first start of 2017, he struggled with his command, giving up five runs on four hits and five walks in  innings pitched. Glasnow was optioned to Indianapolis in June after compiling a 7.45 ERA and 1.91 WHIP over 12 starts. He spent the remainder of the season with Indianapolis, where he was 9–2 with a 1.93 ERA over 15 starts, before returning to Pittsburgh during September call-ups. In 15 games for the Pirates, he compiled a 2–7 record, a 7.69 ERA, and a 2.012 WHIP.

During spring training in 2018, the Pirates decided that Glasnow would start the 2018 season as a relief pitcher.

Tampa Bay Rays

2018
On July 31, 2018, Glasnow was traded to the Tampa Bay Rays, along with Austin Meadows and a player to be named later (Shane Baz) for Chris Archer. He was immediately inserted into their starting rotation. In his 11 starts with Tampa Bay, Glasnow posted an earned run average of 4.20, recording 64 strikeouts in  innings.

2019
After starting the 2019 season 5–0 with a 1.75 earned run average, Glasnow was named American League Pitcher of The Month for April. After straining his arm against the Yankees on May 10, Glasnow went to the 10 Day IL. He went to the 60 day IL on May 26. In September he returned to make four starts, all of them lasting less than 5 innings. Glasnow finished the 2019 season with a 6–1 record and a 1.78 ERA in  innings. Glasnow was the losing pitcher in Game 5 of 2019 ALDS against the Houston Astros.

2020
In the 2020 season he was 5–1 with a 4.08 ERA. He tied for the AL lead in wild pitches, with seven. In the postseason, Glasnow started the clinching game in both the Wild Card round (Blue Jays) and Division Series (Yankees). In Game 5 of the ALDS, he started the game on two days' rest. This was the second straight year Glasnow started the fifth game of the ALDS for the Rays; both times he faced off against his former teammate Gerrit Cole. Glasnow became the second pitcher since 1980 to start a game on two days' rest. He started Game 1 of the World Series against the Los Angeles Dodgers, taking the loss after giving up six walks and six earned runs in  innings.

2021
On June 15, 2021, it was revealed that Glasnow was diagnosed with partial tears in the UCL and flexor strain of his right elbow. He was later placed on the 10-day injured list, and opted to go to rehab rather than have surgery. He was transferred to the 60-day injured list on June 17. On July 31, 2021, it was revealed that Glasnow needed Tommy John surgery after an unsuccessful rehab stint. He missed the rest of 2021 with a chance to miss all of 2022 as well.

2022
On August 22, 2022, the Rays and Glasnow agreed to an extension through the 2024 season. On September 28, Glasnow was activated off of the 60-day IL. Glasnow made his 2022 season debut against the Cleveland Guardians that night, pitching 3 innings with 3 strikeouts while allowing 1 earned run. 

Glasnow was the starting pitcher for the Rays in Game 2 of the AL Wild Card Series between the Rays and the Guardians; he allowed two hits and recorded five strikeouts over five scoreless innings. The Rays eventually lost the game and the series on a walk-off solo homerun by Oscar González in the 15th inning.

2023
On February 28, 2023, it was announced that Glasnow would miss 6-8 weeks with a Grade 2 strain of his left oblique.

Personal life 
Glasnow is a fan of hip hop music and has two music-themed tattoos. On the inside of his lower lip, he has the words "No Juice" tattooed, a reference to the song "No Juice" by Lil Boosie. He used to have a tattoo of the rap artist Ol' Dirty Bastard on the sole of his right foot, but the image has faded.

See also
 List of World Series starting pitchers

References

External links

1993 births
Living people
People from Newhall, Santa Clarita, California
Baseball players from California
Major League Baseball pitchers
Pittsburgh Pirates players
Tampa Bay Rays players
Gulf Coast Pirates players
State College Spikes players
West Virginia Power players
Bradenton Marauders players
Scottsdale Scorpions players
Altoona Curve players
West Virginia Black Bears players
Indianapolis Indians players
Portland Pilots baseball players